The Shire of Tiaro was a local government area in the Wide Bay–Burnett region of Queensland, Australia, between the regional cities of Gympie and Hervey Bay about  north of the state capital, Brisbane.

The name "Tiaro" is of Aboriginal origin, meaning withered or dead tree. 43 per cent of the Shire was covered by State forest.  The main industries in the shire were sugar, beef and dairy cattle, orchards and timber felling and milling.

History

Tiaro Division was created on 11 November 1879 as one of the initial 74 divisions around Queensland under the Divisional Boards Act 1879 with a population of 1852.

On 9 February 1884, following a petition by the ratepayers of subdivisions Nos. 2 and 3 of Tiaro Division, part of Tiaro Division was excised to establish a separate municipality called the Shire of Tiaro. The Tiaro Divisional Board were opposed to the creation of the shire, and had attempted various legal actions to prevent it. The new shire started life in an immediate dispute with the division over the apportionment of the accounts. One of the early actions of the Shire Council was to commission the construction of a shire hall, which many of their ratepayers saw as an unnecessary expense. By April 1886, the ratepayers were petitioning to abolish the Shire. As a result, on 16 December 1886, the shire was abolished and the territory returned to authority of the Tiaro Division.

With the passage of the Local Authorities Act 1902, Tiaro Division became Shire of Tiaro on 31 March 1903.

On 17 February 1917, as part of a restructuring of local government in the Wide Bay–Burnett area, the Shire of Tiaro absorbed the Shire of Tinana and part of the Shire of Granville which had governed areas to the north and east of Tiaro since the 1880s.

On 15 March 2008, under the Local Government (Reform Implementation) Act 2007 passed by the Parliament of Queensland on 10 August 2007, the Shire of Tiaro was dissolved. Division 3 of the Shire, located generally south of Blowers Road, Wards Road and Ularrah Creek and including the towns of Theebine, Curra and Gunalda, became part of the new Gympie Region together with the Shires of Cooloola and Kilkivan. The other two divisions amalgamated with Woocoo and the Cities of Hervey Bay and Maryborough to create Fraser Coast Region. In doing so, Tiaro became one of the only three former shires in Queensland not to stay intact, alongside Taroom and Beaudesert.

Economy
The Shire of Tiaro was home to the Bauple Sugar Mill, which operated from 1886 until 1951, and was also home to a butter and cheese factory and several juice mills.

Towns and localities

The Shire of Tiaro included the following settlements:

Division 1
 Tiaro
 Antigua
 Blackmount
 Pioneers Rest
 St Mary
 Thinoomba

Division 2
 Bauple
 Bauple Forest
 Glenbar
 Glenwood
 Gootchie
 Gundiah
 Kanigan
 Mount Urah
 Munna Creek
 Netherby
 Paterson
 Talegalla Weir
 Tin Can Bay1
 Tinnanbar

Division 3
 Anderleigh
 Curra
 Glen Echo
 Gunalda
 Miva
 Neerdie
 Scotchy Pocket
 Theebine

1 - split with Gympie Region

Chairmen
 1927: Andrew Thompson

Population

References

External links
 

Former local government areas of Queensland
1879 establishments in Australia
2008 disestablishments in Australia
Populated places disestablished in 2008